The Arizona Cactus Garden, or, officially, Arizona Garden, also known as the Cactus Garden, is a small botanical garden specializing in cactus and succulents. It is located on the campus of Stanford University (within the Stanford University Arboretum, and near the Stanford Family Mausoleum and the Angel of Grief), in Stanford, California, USA. It is open to the public daily without charge.

History
The garden was first planted between 1880 and 1883 for Jane and Leland Stanford to a design by landscape architect Rudolph Ulrich who specialized in "Arizona gardens" (here "Arizona" means not the state but rather "arid" so a garden for drought-tolerant plants). It was to be adjacent to their future mansion, and part of the larger gardens for the Stanford estate. However, after the death of their only child in 1884, the mansion was never built and the estate became Stanford University. The garden was regularly maintained until the maintenance gardeners originally hired by the Stanfords, Chung Wah and Ah Wah, retired in 1925 and returned to China.  After, it fell into great disrepair.

In the early years of the university it was a popular place for courting couples.

Restoration
Volunteer restoration work began in 1997 and is ongoing. Notwithstanding decades of neglect, some of the original plants remain. The garden now contains approximately 500 cacti and succulents in 58 beds,  broadly divided into two major sections. The Eastern Hemisphere section is planted with aloes, jade plants and other succulents from Europe, Asia, and Africa, and the Western Hemisphere section holds cacti native to the Americas. Historic plants, comprising some 10-15% of the plantings, have been left in their original locations. September 2021, the plants were not labeled.

Plants known to be in the garden in 2016 include torch lily, century plant, golden barrel cactus, cholla cactus, Mojave yucca, Yucca filifera, Yucca schottii, Peruvian apple cactus, 
soap aloe, flat-flowered aloe, Boojum tree, aeonium, Ponytail palm and Italian cypress.

See also 

 The Arizona Garden at the Hotel Del Monte, another garden by Rudolph Ulrich in 1881-1882
 Stanford University Arboretum
 List of botanical gardens in the United States

External links 
 Photograph of the garden, taken 1894, from the Lick Observatory Records Digital Archive, UC Santa Cruz Library's Digital Collections
 Map of the Garden

References 

Arboreta in California
Botanical gardens in California
Stanford University places
Parks in Santa Clara County, California
Cactus gardens